Mağara ("cave") is a Turkic place name that may refer to:

Mağara, Adana, former name of a district in Adana Province
Mağara, Gadabay, a village in Gadabay Rayon, Azerbaijan
Mağara, İdil, a former Yazidi village in Şırnak Province
Mağara, Silifke, a village in Mersin Province, Turkey
 Magara (Tanzanian ward)

See also 
 Megara (disambiguation)